Teachings on the biblical curse of Cain and the curse of Ham in the Church of Jesus Christ of Latter-day Saints, and their effects on Black people in the LDS Church have changed throughout the church's history. Both church founder Joseph Smith, and his most popular successor Brigham Young taught that Black people were under the curse of Ham, and the curse of Cain. Smith and Young both referred to the curses as a justification for slavery. They also taught that dark skin marked people of African ancestry as cursed by God. In Smith's revisions of the King James Bible, and production of the Book of Abraham he traced their cursed state back to the curses placed on Cain and Ham, and linked the two in the Book of Abraham by positioning Ham's Canaanite posterity as matrilinear descendants of Cain.

Prior to the Latter Day Saint settlement in Missouri, Smith, like many other Northerners, was opposed to slavery, but softened his opposition to slavery during the Missouri years, going as far as writing a very cautious justification of the institution. Following the Mormon Extermination Order and violent expulsion of the church from the slave state, Smith openly embraced abolitionism and preached the equality of all of God's children, in 1841 stating that if the opportunity for blacks were equal to the opportunity provided to whites, blacks could perform as well or even outperform whites.

Young, while seemingly open to blacks holding the priesthood under Smith's leadership and praising of black members of the church, later as Smith's successor used the curse as justification of barring blacks from the priesthood, banning interracial marriages, and opposing black suffrage. He stated that the curse would one day be lifted and that black people would be able to receive the priesthood post-mortally.

In LDS Scripture
According to the Bible, after Cain killed Abel, God cursed him and put a mark on him, but the Bible does not state what the nature of the mark was. The Pearl of Great Price, another Mormon book of scripture, describes the descendants of Cain as dark-skinned, and church president Brigham Young stated, "What is the mark? You will see it on the countenance of every African you ever did see...." In another biblical account, Ham discovered his father Noah drunk and naked in his tent. Because of this, Noah cursed Ham's son, Canaan to be "servants of servants". Although the scriptures do not mention Ham's skin color, some doctrines associated the curse with black people and used it to justify slavery.

Teachings in the late 1800s
Young once taught that the devil was black, and his successor as church president, John Taylor, taught on multiple occasions that the reason that black people (those with the curse of Cain) were allowed to survive the flood was so that the devil could be properly represented on the earth through the children of Ham and his wife Egyptus. The next president, Wilford Woodruff also affirmed that millions of people have Cain's mark of blackness drawing a parallel to modern Native Americans' "curse of redness".

Teachings in the 1900s
In a 1908 Liahona article for missionaries, an anonymous but church-sanctioned author reviewed the scriptures about blackness in the Pearl of Great Price. The author postulated that Ham married a descendant of Cain. Therefore Canaan received two curses, one from Noah, and one from being a descendant of Cain. The article states that Canaan was the "sole ancestor of the Negro race" and explicitly linked his curse to be "servant of servants" to black priesthood denial. To support this idea, the article also discussed how Pharaoh, a descendant of Canaan according to LDS scripture, could not have the priesthood, because Noah "cursed him as pertaining to the Priesthood".

In 1931, apostle Joseph Fielding Smith wrote on the same topic in The Way to Perfection: Short Discourses on Gospel Themes, generating controversy within and without Mormonism. For evidence that modern blacks were descended from Cain, Smith wrote that "it is generally believed that" Cain's curse was continued through his descendants and through Ham's wife. Smith states that "some of the brethren who were associate with Joseph Smith have declared that he taught this doctrine."

After the temple and priesthood restrictions removed
In 1978, when the church ended the ban on the priesthood, apostle Bruce R. McConkie taught that the ancient curse of Cain and Ham was no longer in effect. General authorities in the LDS Church favored Smith's explanation until 2013, when a Church-published online essay disavowed the idea that black skin is the sign of a curse. The Old Testament Student Manual, which is published by the church and is the manual currently used to teach the Old Testament in LDS institutes, teaches that Canaan could not hold the priesthood because of the cursing of Ham his father, but makes no reference to race.

Antediluvian people of Canaan
According to the Book of Moses, the people of Canaan were a group of people that lived during the time of Enoch, before the Canaanites mentioned in the Bible. Enoch prophesied that the people of Canaan would war against the people of Shum, and that God would curse their land with heat, and that a blackness would come upon them. When Enoch called the people to repentance and established Zion, he taught everyone except the people of Canaan. The Book of Abraham identifies Pharaoh as a Canaanite. There is no explicit connection from the antediluvian people of Canaan to Cain's descendants, the Canaanites descended from Ham's son Canaan or modern black people. However, the Book of Moses identifies both Cain's descendants and the people of Canaan as black and cursed, and they were frequently used interchangeably. Bruce R. McConkie justified restrictions on teaching black people because Enoch did not teach the people of Canaan.

See also
Black people and Mormonism
Joseph Smith's views on Black people
Mormonism and slavery
Racial segregation of churches in the United States
Proslavery

References

History of the Church of Jesus Christ of Latter-day Saints
Mormonism and race
Brigham Young
Criticism of Mormonism
Anti-black racism in the United States